The Ferry Street Bridge or Ferry Street–Thorofare Canal bridge is a bridge located at Ferry Street over the Thorofare Canal in Grosse Ile, Michigan.  It was listed on the National Register of Historic Places in 2000.

History

In 1947, the Wayne County Road Commission replaced the  Pratt truss bridge that had previously spanned the Thorofare Canal with the current structure.

Description
The railings are solid concrete, and marble plates mounted at the northeast and southeast corners of the bridge note that the bridge is Job 413 of the Wayne County Road Commission. Three bents with square concrete posts support the bridge. The bridge is a continuous concrete slab, used by the road commission during World War II and immediately after, presumably due to the difficulty of obtaining steel. The bridge is considered a good representative example of this type of bridge, retaining high integrity.

See also

References

External links

Ferry Road Bridge from HistoricBridges.org: Multiple photographs of the bridge

Road bridges on the National Register of Historic Places in Michigan
Bridges completed in 1947
Bridges in Wayne County, Michigan
National Register of Historic Places in Wayne County, Michigan
Concrete bridges in the United States